Vitex  is a genus of flowering plants in the sage family Lamiaceae. It has about 250 species. Common names include chaste tree or chastetree, traditionally referring to V. agnus-castus, but often applied to other species, as well.

Species of Vitex are native throughout the tropics and subtropics, with a few species in temperate Eurasia and one in New Zealand.

About 18 species are known in cultivation. V. agnus-castus and Vitex negundo are often grown in temperate climates. About six others are frequently grown in the tropics. Most of the cultivated species serve as ornamentals. Some provide valuable lumber. The flexible limbs of some species are used in basket weaving. Some of the aromatic species are used medicinally or to repel mosquitos.

The genus Vitex was named by Linnaeus in Species Plantarum in 1753. Vitex was the name used by Pliny the Elder for Vitex agnus-castus. It is derived from the Latin vieo, meaning to weave or to tie up, a reference to the use of V. agnus-castus in basketry.

As a result of phylogenetic studies of DNA sequences, Vitex is one of several genera that were transferred from the Verbenaceae to the Lamiaceae in the 1990s. It is the largest genus in the subfamily Viticoideae of Lamiaceae. Taxon sampling in molecular phylogenetic studies has never been sufficient to test the monophyly of the Viticoideae, but it is generally thought to be an unnatural group. The subfamily is probably diphyletic, with Premna, Gmelina, and Cornutia constituting one clade, and with Vitex, Petitia, Pseudocarpidium, and Teijsmanniodendron constituting the other.

Description
Vitex is a genus of shrubs and trees, from 1.0 to 35 m tall. Some species have whitish bark that is characteristically furrowed. Leaves are opposite, usually compound. The fruit is a drupe.

Circumscription 
In 2009, a molecular phylogenetic study showed that three small genera, Paravitex, Viticipremna, and Tsoongia, are embedded in Vitex. These three genera were duly sunk into synonymy with Vitex.

Pseudocarpidium, Petitia, and Teijsmanniodendron possibly are nested within Vitex. Sampling in the 2009 study was not sufficient to determine the phylogenetic position of these genera. The relationships of Teijsmanniodendron to these genera was not discussed in a revision of Teijsmanniodendron in 2009.

Selected species

 Vitex acunae
 Vitex agnus-castus — chasteberry, monk's pepper, chastetree
 Vitex ajugaeflora
 Vitex altissima
 Vitex amaniensis
 Vitex capitata
 Vitex chrysocarpa
 Vitex cofassus
 Vitex cooperi
 Vitex cymosa
 Vitex divaricata
 Vitex doniana — wild African black plum, koronfinfin
 Vitex evoluta
 Vitex gaumeri
 Vitex gigantea
 Vitex heptaphylla
 Vitex keniensis — Meru oak
 Vitex kuylenii
 Vitex lehmbachii
 Vitex leucoxylon
 Vitex lignum-vitae — yellow hollywood, lignum-vitae
 Vitex lindenii
 Vitex longisepala
 Vitex lucens — puriri
 Vitex megapotamica
 Vitex negundo — five-leaf chastetree
 Vitex obovata
 Vitex orinocensis
 Vitex parviflora — Molave tree
 Vitex peduncularis
 Vitex pinnata
 Vitex quinata
 Vitex rotundifolia — beach vitex
 Vitex thyrsiflora
 Vitex triflora
 Vitex trifolia — simpleleaf chastetree
 Vitex tripinnata
 Vitex urceolata
 Vitex yaundensis
 Vitex zanzibarensis
 Vitex zeyheri

References

Further reading
 Ray Harley, "In search of Labiatae in Eastern Brazil", Vitex: A Newsletter for Lamiaceae and Verbenaceae Research, Issue 1, February 2000, page 5.

External links
 
 
 List of Genera in Lamiaceae, Missouri Botanical Garden
 Vitex, Index Nominum Genericorum
 Vitex in Biodiversity Heritage Library
 CRC World Dictionary of Plant Names: R-Z
 Systematics of Lamiaceae Subfamily Viticoideae

 
Lamiaceae genera
Taxa named by Carl Linnaeus